Edward Humes is a Pulitzer Prize-winning journalist and non-fiction writer.

Biography
Humes was born in Philadelphia and attended Hampshire College.

In 1989 he received the Pulitzer Prize for specialized reporting for investigative stories he wrote about the United States military for the Orange County Register.

Afterward, he began writing non-fiction books. 
Humes is the author of 13 nonfiction books, including the bestselling Mississippi Mud; No Matter How Loud I Shout; Baby E.R.; A Man and His Mountain; and Garbology, a popular selection for the First Year Experience program on college campuses.

In 2001, Humes spent a year teaching a writing workshop at Whitney High School in Cerritos, California, a middle-class Los Angeles suburb.  His observations while at the school led to his narrative non-fiction book School of Dreams, published in 2004.

Humes is a contributing writer for Sierra Magazine, California Lawyer and Los Angeles Magazine, among other publications. He is married to journalist and author Donna Wares and lives in Southern California.

Books

Non-fiction

Garbology: Our Dirty Love Affair with Trash Publisher: Avery (April 19, 2012)  
 
 
 
  (contributor)

True crime
 Burned: A Story of Murder and the Crime That Wasn't, Dutton, January 8, 2019
 Mississippi Mud: Southern Justice and the Dixie Mafia, Pocket, December 1, 1995
 Buried Secrets: A True Story of Serial Murder, New Amer Library, 
 Murderer With a Badge: The Secret Life of a Rogue Cop, E P Dutton, November 1, 1992

Article
 Talk Radio Evolution, The Huffington Post, February 23, 2007.

References

External links
 Edward Humes' personal web site
 

American non-fiction crime writers
Pulitzer Prize for Beat Reporting winners
Year of birth missing (living people)
Living people
Hampshire College alumni